Ahn Doo-hee (alternative spelling: Ahn Doo-whi) (24 March 1917 in Ryūsen-gun, Heianhoku-dō, Korea – 23 October 1996) was a Korean lieutenant who carried out the assassination of independence activist  Korean leader Kim Koo on 26 June 1949. Officially, it is maintained that Ahn Doo-hee acted alone, although some have theorized that Ahn was part of a broader conspiracy, possibly the CIA. Ahn died at the hands of an admirer of Kim Koo in 1996.

Kim was at home, reading poetry, when Ahn, a lieutenant in the South Korean Army, burst in and shot him four times. For the assassination, Ahn was convicted and sentenced to a term of life in prison; however, shortly thereafter, his sentence was commuted to a term of 15 years by then newly elected Korean president Syngman Rhee. At his trial, Ahn maintained that he was solely responsible for the assassination.

At the outset of the Korean War in 1950, Ahn was released from prison, having served only one year of his 15-year sentence. Upon his release, Ahn was re-instated as a military officer. After serving under Rhee during the Korean War, Ahn was discharged in 1953, having attained the rank of colonel. After Syngman Rhee fled Korea in response to the April Revolution of 1960, Ahn went into hiding, living under an assumed name.

On 13 April 1992, a confession by Ahn was published by Korean newspaper Dongah Ilbo. In the confession, Ahn claimed that the assassination of Kim had been ordered by Kim Chang-ryong, who served as the head of national security under the Rhee administration.

After many years of living as an exile in his native country, and having never served the remainder of his prison sentence, Ahn was assassinated by Park Gi-seo, a 49-year-old bus driver and admirer of Kim Koo, on 23 October 1996. The weapon used to kill Ahn was a wooden club inscribed with the words, "Justice Stick". Ahn was 79 years old at the time. He was cremated and his ashes were scattered in the Han River.

In 2001, declassified United States military documents dating from 1949 revealed that Ahn had been an informant and, later, an agent, for the U.S. Counter-Intelligence Corps (US CIC) in Korea. Those documents also revealed that Ahn was a member of the extremist nationalist group known as the White Clothes Party (백의사 baekuisa, romanised at the time as baikyi-sa).

References 

1917 births
1996 deaths
People from Ryongchon County
Assassinated South Korean people
Murdered criminals
Deaths by beating
South Korean assassins
People murdered in South Korea
1949 murders in South Korea